Aleksandr Alexandrovich Averin (born January 13, 1981, Moscow) is a  Russian  political dissident and publicist. He works as journalist.

Biography

Political career 
Aleksandr Averin was born in Moscow. He studied at the Moscow Institute of Steel and Alloys. Averin has been a member of the National Bolshevik Party since 1999. Averin has been Eduard Limonov's official press secretary since 2002. In 2006, Averin co-founded the coalition The Other Russia. In 2006, Aleksandr Averin was one of the organizers of the Dissenters' March in Moscow, during which he was repeatedly detained. In 2009, Averin was one of the organizers of the Strategy-31. Since 2010, Averin has been the spokesperson for the political party The Other Russia.

War in Donbas 
During the Russo-Ukrainian War Averin served in pro-Russian separatist forces

Arrest 
On 7 April 2018, Aleksandr Averin was arrested by Russian police on his return from Donbas. He was accused of disobedience to border guards and illegal possession of a weapon. He did not plead guilty. On 7 December 2018, Aleksandr Averin was sentenced to 3 years in prison. Political party "The Other Russia" recognized Averin as a political prisoner.

References

External links
The Other Russia - Aleksandr Averin's biography
Official blog of Aleksandr Averin in LJ
Official blog of Aleksandr Averin in VK

Living people
1981 births
Journalists from Moscow
National Bolshevik Party politicians
Russian dissidents
Russian nationalists
Pro-Russian people of the war in Donbas
Russian prisoners and detainees
National Bolsheviks